In mathematics, the EHP spectral sequence is a spectral sequence used for inductively calculating the homotopy groups of spheres localized at some prime p.

For  the spectral sequence uses some exact sequences associated to the fibration 
,
where  stands for a loop space and the (2) is localization of a topological space at the prime 2.  This gives a spectral sequence with  term equal to 
  
The spectral sequence has the advantage that the input is previously calculated homotopy groups.

For arbitrary primes one uses  some fibrations found by : 

where  is the -skeleton of the loop space .

References

 
 

Spectral sequences